Maeleachlainn Ó Cobhthaigh, Irish poet, died 1429.

A son of An Clasach Ó Cobhthaigh (died 1415) and a brother of Domhnall Ó Cobhthaigh (died 1446), Ó Cobhthaigh was a member of a hereditary bardic family. He was killed by Edmond Dalton, who had conquered his district.

References

 Ó Cobhthaigh family, pp. 435–436, in Oxford Dictionary of National Biography, volume 41, Norbury-Osbourne, September 2004.

Medieval Irish poets
1429 deaths
Irish male poets
People from County Westmeath
15th-century Irish poets
Year of birth unknown